Columbiaville is a hamlet in the town of Stockport, Columbia County, New York, United States. Columbiaville has a post office with ZIP code 12050, which opened on December 28, 1888.

References

Hamlets in Columbia County, New York
Hamlets in New York (state)